Caiser Sérgio Gomes (born 4 April 2000) is a Bissau-Guinean professional footballer who plays as a defender for Campeonato de Portugal club Alverca.

Career

Alverca
Gomes started his professional career with Campeonato de Portugal side Alverca, spending a season on loan with fellow third-tier side Fabril Barreiro in 2018–19.

North Texas
On 19 April 2021, Gomes joined USL League One side North Texas SC on a season-long loan. He made his debut for the club on 8 May 2021, appearing as a 62nd-minute substitute during a 1–0 loss to Chattanooga Red Wolves.

References

External links
 Profile at FC Dallas

2000 births
Living people
Sportspeople from Bissau
Association football defenders
F.C. Alverca players
G.D. Fabril players
North Texas SC players
Campeonato de Portugal (league) players
USL League One players
Bissau-Guinean expatriate footballers
Bissau-Guinean footballers
Expatriate soccer players in the United States
Expatriate footballers in Portugal